Ernest R. Godfrey (April 19, 1892 – June 12, 1980) was an American football player and coach of football and basketball.  Godfrey was inducted into the College Football Hall of Fame as a coach in 1972.

Godfrey was born in Dover, Ohio graduating from Dover High School in 1911.   Godfrey played college football at Ohio State from 1912–1914.

Godfrey served as head football coach at Wittenberg University for 11 seasons beginning in 1916, interrupted for the next two seasons due to World War I where he served at a 1st Lt in the U.S. Army, returning to coaching in 1919.  Over his coaching tenure, Wittenberg achieved a 63–24–8 record, including two league titles in 1927 and 1928.  Godfrey also coached the men's basketball team, earning a 95–65 record.  

In 1929, he returned to his alma mater, Ohio State University, as an assistant football coach.  He served at Ohio State for 33 years under seven head coaches—Sam Willaman, Francis Schmidt, Paul Brown, Carroll Widdoes, Paul Bixler, Wes Fesler, and Woody Hayes.  He was the line coach for 19 years, defensive backfield coach for four years, and freshman coach for ten years.

Head coaching record

College football

References

External links
 
 

1892 births
1980 deaths
American football ends
American football centers
Ohio State Buckeyes football players
Ohio State Buckeyes football coaches
Wittenberg Tigers football coaches
Wittenberg Tigers men's basketball coaches
High school football coaches in Ohio
College Football Hall of Fame inductees
Basketball coaches from Ohio
People from Dover, Ohio